Orgelet is a commune in the Jura department in Bourgogne-Franche-Comté in eastern France.

Surrounding communes
Some adjacent communes of Orgelet are:
 Présilly
 Senay - Hamlet of Presilly

Population

See also
Communes of the Jura department

References

Communes of Jura (department)